Elizabeth Bolden (née Jones; August 15, 1890 – December 11, 2006) was an American supercentenarian who, at the time of her death at age 116 years, 118 days, was recognized by Guinness World Records as the then-world's oldest living person.

Biography 
Elizabeth Jones was born in 1890 in Somerville, Tennessee, the daughter of freed slaves.

She married Louis Bolden (1892–1955) in 1908, and their first child, a son, Ezell, was born on September 21, 1909. Elizabeth and Louis Bolden had three sons and four daughters and raised cotton and subsistence crops on farmland near Memphis until the 1950s. Only two daughters were living at the time of Bolden's death in 2006; they were Queen Esther Rhodes, who died in 2007 at age 90, and Mamie Brittmon, the latter dying at 102 in 2022. At the time of her 116th birthday in August 2006, Bolden also had 40 grandchildren, 75 great-grandchildren, 150 great-great-grandchildren, 220 great-great-great-grandchildren and 75 great-great-great-great-grandchildren, for a total of 562 living, direct descendants.

Later life 

In her final years, Bolden resided in a Memphis nursing home that she had lived in since she was 109, and was described by her family as unable to communicate. They requested that media attention (such as interviews and visits) be limited. While she was the world's oldest person Bolden was rarely seen in public.

She was photographed for two different books in early 2005, and was featured in Jet magazine in May 2005 and the Memphis Commercial Appeal in June 2005. For her 116th birthday, new photographs were released for the first time in almost a year, and her family said that she was looking forward to her birthday.

Age records 
Elizabeth Bolden was verified in April 2005 as being the oldest documented resident of the United States since the death of Emma Verona Johnston the previous December. Prior to this, Bettie Wilson, had been the oldest known American. After the death of Hendrikje van Andel on August 30, 2005, she was thought to be the world's oldest living person until December 9, 2005, when María Capovilla was authenticated as older. She became the oldest living person following Capovilla's death on August 27, 2006. This was officially confirmed on September 17, 2006, by Guinness World Records.

At the time of her death aged 116 years 118 days she was the sixth-oldest undisputed person ever documented. After her death, Emiliano Mercado del Toro became the world's oldest person and Julie Winnefred Bertrand became the world's oldest woman.

See also 
 List of the verified oldest people
 100 oldest American people ever

References

External links 
 
 CBS News – Memphis Woman Turns 116
 The Associated Press – Memphis woman listed as world's oldest dies at 116
 CNN – Oldest woman dies at age 116
 Sun-Sentinel – Memphis woman listed as world's oldest dies at age 116
 Blackamericaweb – Elizabeth Bolden, America's oldest woman and daughter of freed slaves, dies at 116

1890 births
2006 deaths
People from Memphis, Tennessee
American supercentenarians
African-American centenarians
Women supercentenarians
African-American Christians
People from Somerville, Tennessee